Trimenia is a genus of plants in the family Trimeniaceae. It contains 13 species.

References

Austrobaileyales
Angiosperm genera